Benoît Bourrust (born 16 Jun 1985) is a French rugby union player. A prop forward, he played for Auch, Sale Sharks and Perpignan.

For the start of the 2012-13 season he signed for Welsh team Cardiff Blues.

References

External links
 Cardiff Blues profile

French rugby union players
Cardiff Rugby players
1985 births
Living people
People from Auch
Rugby union props
Sportspeople from Gers